Enterprise class may refer to:

 Enterprise-class frigate, the final class of 28-gun sailing frigates of the sixth-rate to be produced for the Royal Navy
 Enterprise-class starship, a discarded name for the fictional Constitution-class starship refit in the Star Trek universe